Janet Wanja (born 24 February 1984 in Nairobi) is a volleyball player from Kenya, who competed for her native country at the 2004 Summer Olympics in Athens,  Greece, wearing the number #7 jersey. There she ended up in eleventh place with the Kenya women's national team.

Wanja went to Mukumu Girls High School. She has played for Kenya Commercial Bank and Kenya Pipeline.

In 2007 under there then coach Sammy Kirongo led Kenya's national side to its seventh victory at the Women's African Volleyball Championship in the final against Algeria. The Kenyan team included Wanja and she was judged the "best setter". Dorcas Ndasaba was judged "best player" after she gained the final point to deliver Kenya's victory in straight sets.

In 2015 Brackcides Agala was the captain of the national team and Wanja assisted her. The team announced that they refused to play for the 2015 FIVB World Grand Prix in Canberra after several victories. The players were annoyed that they had not been paid allowances that had been promised by the Kenya Volleyball Federation. The boycott was successful and the team played and won against Peru. However, the KVF were not pleased and when the team's were announced for the 2016 Summer Olympics neither Brackcides Agala or Janet Wanja were asked to the qualifying matches.

In 2017 Wanja was in the Kenya Pipeline team in Cairo as they contested the Women's Africa Club Volleyball Championship.

References

 FIVB biography
 Athens 2004

1984 births
Living people
Kenyan women's volleyball players
Volleyball players at the 2004 Summer Olympics
Olympic volleyball players of Kenya
Sportspeople from Nairobi